Arkansas Highway 226 is a designation for two state highways in northeast Arkansas. The main segment of  runs east from an intersection of U.S. Route 67/Arkansas Highway 367 to I-555/US 63/AR 18 in Jonesboro. A short route of  runs in rural Jackson County west of Tuckerman.

Route description

Western Jackson County
AR 226 runs east from Jackson CR 278 to cross AR 17 to AR 37, where it terminates.

Swifton to Jonesboro

The route then runs due east near Swifton through AR 18 in Cash, also meeting AR 349 near Jonesboro. Highway 226 winds into Jonesboro, meeting US 63/AR 18 and terminating. The route is two-lane undivided for most of its length, passing through flat, square farmland.

In 2012, construction was completed that widened four miles of the highway to a four-lane divided facility from the highway's intersection with U.S. 67 (Future I-57) to just west of Cash. This was the first section of a larger plan that will ultimately widen Highway 226 to four lanes divided from U.S. 67 to U.S. 49 near Gibson.  Once completed, this widening project will give motorists a four-lane, divided route the entire length from Little Rock to Jonesboro.

History

The route became a state highway in 1958, traveling from an area south of Swifton east to Gibson. AR 226 was later extended to Jonesboro, including a concurrency with AR 39 (now US 49). When US 49 replaced AR 39 around 1980, AR 226 was split into its current alignment and AR 226S. The short Jackson County segment was added to the system in 1996.

Had I-30 been extended, there were plans to upgrade AR 226 to Interstate standards and designate it as "Interstate 730".

Major intersections

|colspan=5 align=center| AR 226 short segment ends, AR 226 main segment begins at Arkansas Highway 367

Jonesboro spur

Arkansas Highway 226 Spur is a spur route in Jonesboro.

Major intersections

See also

 List of state highways in Arkansas

References

External links

226
Transportation in Jackson County, Arkansas
Transportation in Craighead County, Arkansas
Jonesboro, Arkansas
U.S. Route 49